Ethmia lineatonotella is a moth in the family Depressariidae. It is found in India (Darjeeling, Assam, Kurseong), Myanmar, Vietnam, China and Taiwan.

Adults are on wing nearly year-round.

The larvae feed on Ehretia longiflora.

References

Moths described in 1867
lineatonotella